The 2021 Wiltshire Council election took place on 6 May 2021 as part of the 2021 local elections in the United Kingdom. All 98 councillors were elected from electoral divisions which returned one councillor each by first-past-the-post voting for a four-year term of office.

Council composition
After the previous election the composition of the council was:

Prior to the election the composition of the council was:

After the election the composition of the council was:

Results summary

Electoral division results 

The electoral division results listed below are based on the changes from the 2017 elections, not taking into account any party defections or by-elections.

Sitting councillors are marked with an asterisk (*).

Aldbourne and Ramsbury

Alderbury and Whiteparish

Amesbury East and Bulford

Amesbury South

Amesbury West

Avon Valley

Bowerhill

Note: Nick Holder was elected in a 2019 by-election in Melksham Without South.

Box and Colerne

Bradford-on-Avon North

Bradford-on-Avon South

Brinkworth

Note: in 2017, Chris Hirst was elected in Royal Wootton Bassett South

Bromham, Rowde and Roundway

By Brook

Calne Central

Calne Chilvester and Abberd

Calne North

Calne Rural

Calne South

Chippenham Cepen Park and Derriads

Chippenham Cepen Park and Hunters Moon

Chippenham Hardenhuish

Chippenham Hardens and Central

Chippenham Lowden and Rowden

Chippenham Monkton

Chippenham Pewsham

Chippenham Sheldon

Corsham Ladbrook

Corsham Pickwick

Corsham Without

Cricklade and Latton

Devizes East

Devizes North

Devizes Rural West

Devizes South

Downton and Ebble Valley

Durrington

Ethandune

Note: Suzanne Grahem Wickham had previously held the seat for the Conservatives in a 2019 by-election.

Fovant and Chalke Valley

Hilperton

Holt

Kington

Laverstock

Ludgershall North and Rural

Lyneham

Malmesbury

Marlborough East

Marlborough West

Melksham East

Melksham Forest

Melksham South

Melksham Without North and Shurnhold

Melksham Without West and Rural

Mere

Minety

Nadder Valley

Old Sarum and Lower Bourne Valley

Pewsey

Pewsey Vale East

Pewsey Vale West

Purton

Redlynch and Landford

Royal Wootton Bassett East

Royal Wootton Bassett North

Royal Wootton Bassett South and West

Salisbury Bemerton Heath

Salisbury Fisherton and Bemerton Village

Salisbury Harnham East

Salisbury Harnham West

Salisbury Milford

Salisbury St Edmund's

Salisbury St Francis and Stratford

Salisbury St Paul's

Sherston

Southwick

The Lavingtons

Tidworth East and Ludgershall South

Tidworth North and West

Till Valley

Note: Kevin Daley had held the seat of Till and Wylye Valley in a 2020 by-election.

Tisbury

Trowbridge Adcroft

Trowbridge Central

Trowbridge Drynham

Note: Andrew James Bryant had previously gained the seat for the Liberal Democrats in a 2019 by-election.

Trowbridge Grove

Trowbridge Lambrok

Note: Jo Trigg had previously gained the seat for the Liberal Democrats in a 2019 by-election.

Trowbridge Park

Trowbridge Paxcroft

Urchfont and Bishops Cannings

Warminster Broadway

Warminster East

Warminster North and Rural

Warminster West

Westbury East

Westbury North

Note: Carole King had previously held the seat for the Liberal Democrats in a 2019 by-election.

Westbury West

Note: in 2017, Matthew Dean was elected in Salisbury St Pauls

Wilton

Winsley and Westwood

Winterslow and Upper Bourne Valley

Wylye Valley

Note: in 2017, Christopher Newbury was elected in the former Warminster Copheap and Wylye

By-elections between 2021 and 2025

Salisbury St Paul's by-election

References

External links
Statement of Persons Nominated , wiltshire.gov.uk

Wiltshire Council elections
2020s in Wiltshire
2021 English local elections